is the second single by Japanese Darkwave duo, Aural Vampire, released October 10, 2012. The single is the second release from their album Razors on Backstreet, after the Kerguelen Vortex EP. This is the first release from the newly formed Aural Vampire with four new members. The music video for Soloween is animated and made by their own member Raveman.

Track listing

Personnel 
Exo-Chika – vocals
Raveman – production, lyrics 
Wu-Chy – bass 
Higuchuuhei – guitar 
Zen – keyboard
Izu – drums

Reception

Charts

References

External links
Official Website

2012 singles
2012 songs